Rashed Zaman is a Bangladeshi cinematographer and cameraman. He won the Bangladesh National Film Award for Best Cinematography for the film Aynabaji (2016).

Selected films
 Bishaash - 2010
 Monkey Mind -2010
 Dub Satar - 2011
 Desha: The Leader - (2014)
 Aynabaji - 2016

Awards and nominations
National Film Awards

References

External links
 

Bangladeshi cinematographers
Best Cinematographer National Film Award (Bangladesh) winners
Living people
Year of birth missing (living people)